The Nelson A. Rockefeller College of Public Affairs & Policy is a public policy school composed of the Departments of Public Administration & Policy and Political Science at the University at Albany, SUNY, United States. The department provides educational preparation for academic and public service careers, to undertake research on significant public problems and issues, and to assist in the continuing professional development of government executives. Rockefeller College has an enhanced interdisciplinary approach to its public policy mission.

The College offers appropriate assistance to the governments of New York State and the United States, and to foreign governments and international organizations in meeting the responsibilities of contemporary citizenship and governance through special courses and conferences; research and consultation; and publications for the dissemination of information.

The college is located on the downtown campus of the University at Albany, SUNY, at 135 Western Avenue, Albany, New York.

In 2020, it was nationally ranked as the 19th Public Affairs graduate program (out of 276) in U.S. News & World Report magazine.

References

External links
 

Educational institutions in the United States with year of establishment missing
Institutions founded by the Rockefeller family
Public policy schools
University at Albany, SUNY
Universities and colleges in Albany County, New York
Organizations based in Albany, New York